Caroline Wozniacki was the defending champion, but lost to Angelique Kerber 6–4, 6–4 in the final.

Seeds

Draw

Finals

Top half

Bottom half

Qualifying

Seeds

Qualifiers

Draw

First qualifier

Second qualifier

Third qualifier

Fourth qualifier

References

 Main Draw
 Qualifying Draw

e-Boks Open - Singles
2012 Singles